Bartolomeo Cittadella (1636–1704), a painter of the Venetian school, who, according to Guarienti, flourished at Vicenza in the latter part of the seventeenth century. He wrought with great rapidity, and Lanzi says there are a multitude of his works at Vicenza, in which he imitated the styles of Paolo Veronese and the younger Palma. Probably from this fact he did not acquire much distinction.

References

Bartolomeo Cittadella on Artnet

1636 births
1704 deaths
17th-century Italian painters
Italian male painters
18th-century Italian painters
Painters from Venice
People from Vicenza
18th-century Italian male artists